Wildgänse rauschen durch die Nacht (Wild geese rush through the night) is a war poem by Walter Flex. It was published in 1917 in his poem book Im Felde zwischen Nacht und Tag (In the (battle) field between day and night). The poem was also included in his 1916 novel Der Wanderer zwischen beiden Welten (The Wanderer Between Two Worlds).

The lyrics achieved popularity through a musical adaptation written by Robert Götz. Götz's melody existed as early as 1916 but Wild Geese was widely sung by members of the Wandervogel movement / Bündische Jugend society during the late 1920s. It is also sung in the Austrian, German and French army.

Creation
The date of creation of the lyrics are unknown. The inspiration for the poem is described in his memoirs The Wanderer Between Two Worlds:

 "[…] I was a volunteer as a hundred nights earlier now lying on the forest clearing plowed by grenades and serving as listening post to stare into the flickering light of the stormy night, walked by the restless spotlights on German and French trenches. The roar of the oncoming night storm swelled up on me. Strange voices filled the quivering air. About helmet tip and barrel it sang and whistled, cutting, shrill and plaintive, and high over the hostile armies, which lurked opposite to each in the darkness went with razor-sharp cry a migratory grey geese flight northbound. […] The cordon of our Silesian Regiment stretched from Bois des Chevaliers to the Bois de Verin, and the army of migratory wild geese ranged ghostly on us all away. Without seeing my intertwined lines in the darkness I wrote on a scrap of paper a few verses: […]"

The Wanderer Between Two Worlds achieved great popularity in Germany. After participating in the Lake Naroch Offensive Flex returned to Berlin to write a series of reports on the offensive, which was published posthumously in 1919 as Die russische Frühjahrsoffensive 1916 (The Russian Spring Offensive of 1916). He died on October 17, 1917 from wounds sustained during Operation Albion.

The poem

References

External links
 A German version of the poem in "Der Wanderer zwischen beiden Welten" at Projekt Gutenberg-DE
 Soundfile at Ingeb.org
 Musique-militaire.fr

1917 songs
German Youth Movement
French military marches
Songs about the military